Bethany Christian Trust is a Scottish  charity based in Edinburgh focusing on homeless and vulnerable people.  

The charity was established in 1983 by Rev Alan Berry, then a minister in Leith, Edinburgh, in response to the homeless and vulnerable people he confronted daily.  

Bethany Christian Trust runs programs both on the street and in dedicated buildings. It provides various counseling and education services along with community awareness projects.

External links
Official website

Charities based in Edinburgh
Homelessness in Scotland
Christian charities based in Scotland
1983 establishments in Scotland
Christian organizations established in 1983
Vulnerable adults
Christianity in Edinburgh
Alcohol abuse in the United Kingdom
Alcohol in Scotland
Drugs in Scotland
Children's charities based in Scotland
Homelessness charities